Atanasiu is a Romanian surname. Notable people with the surname include:

Ion Atanasiu (1894–1978), Romanian chemist
Teodor Atanasiu (born 1962), Romanian engineer and politician
Vasile Atanasiu (1886–1964), Romanian general
Virgil Atanasiu (born 1937), Romanian sports shooter

See also
Athanasiu

Romanian-language surnames